Nicolas de Géa (born 24 February 1983 in Talence, France) is a French attacking midfielder who has played for Stade Bordelais since 2010. He previously played in Ligue 2 with RC Strasbourg, and had spells in the Championnat National with AS Beauvais Oise, Nîmes Olympique and Chamois Niortais. He has played a five with Zizou and Dugarry and a croisé Mathieu Bodmer one time.

References
Nicolas de Géa profile at FootNational

1984 births
Living people
French footballers
Association football midfielders
RC Strasbourg Alsace players
Chamois Niortais F.C. players
Stade Bordelais (football) players
Trélissac FC players
People from Talence
Sportspeople from Gironde
Footballers from Nouvelle-Aquitaine